The Battle of Praça da Sé was a conflict between anti-fascists and integralists in the center of the city of São Paulo on October 7, 1934. Brazilian Integralist Action (AIB) had scheduled a rally for that day to commemorate the two years of the Integralist Manifesto, and, as soon as they learned of this intention, antifascists in São Paulo organized themselves to prevent the event from taking place. Although without centralized leadership, all the forces on the left of São Paulo took part in the conflict, which resulted in seven deaths - including an anti-fascist student, three Integralists, two police officers and a civil guard - and around thirty wounded.

For the left, this event became a symbol of the anti-fascist struggle and against the reactionary elements of national politics. Combined with the identification of the body of the young militant Tobias Warchavski, the Battle of Praça da Sé triggered a political campaign against the repressive policy of the Getúlio Vargas government, which combined with anti-fascist sentiment, boosting a more general movement against the "reaction" and aiming for the formation of a broad progressive front, which would be achieved with the formation of the National Liberation Alliance by the Brazilian Communist Party.

Context
The 1930s were marked by political radicalization, as a result of the crisis of liberalism after the Wall Street Crash of 1929. The rise of fascism and the radicalization of communist movements had reverberations in Brazil, amidst the context marked by the functioning of the National Constituent Assembly between 1933 and 1934. The ideological and political crisis of liberalism in Brazil turned into a political issue not only for economic and political elites, but also for the middle classes and workers, who sought alternatives to liberalism by the right, with fascism, and by the left, with anarchism, socialism and communism. In practice, this debate suffered the competition of the confrontation between fascism and anti-fascism.

Although fascism and anti-fascism had clashed in the country since the 1920s, it was with the creation of the Brazilian Integralist Action (AIB) in 1932 that the dispute became part of national political issues. Thus, the AIB and the leftists vied for the attention of the urban masses in organized events that sought to surpass in magnitude those of the competitors, soon departing for open conflict.

Background

Conflicts between anti-fascists and integralists had been going on since 1933. One of the first records took place during an Anti-Integralist Conference, organized by the Center for Social Culture (CCS) on November 14 and with the participation of representatives from several political currents on the left, such as the socialist Carmelo Crispino, the anarchist Hermínio Marcos and a representative of the newspaper O Homem Livre. The event, held at the União das Classes Laboriosas hall, brought together about a thousand people. In the midst of the conference, some integralists appeared in order to disturb it, however, when they noticed the amount of anti-fascist elements that were there, withdrew and began to look for reinforcements in the vicinity, being repelled by a group of workers.

Throughout the year, reports began to emerge of aggression by Integralists against left-wing militants in various parts of the country, so the FUA decided to organize a counter-demonstration for December 15, 1933, the date the AIB had set an integralist rally. The disclosure by the FUA that there would be a counter-demonstration caused the AIB to cancel the march. The FUA rally, however, took place at the headquarters of the Lega Lombarda and was attended by about two thousand participants, including members of the PCB and the Anti-War Committee. In this event, the FUA demonstrated its intentions of articulating with other anti-fascist organizations from other states to form a National Anti-Fascist Single Front, in addition to having called the São Paulo workers movement to form a trade union front.

In 1934, the political climate in the country radicalized. On April 20, thirteen days after the start of the vote on the Constitution, around 4,000 Integralists paraded through the streets of Rio de Janeiro. About a month later, on June 24, an integralist parade took place in the capital of São Paulo, with around 3,000 people. A week later, on July 2, a public holiday in Bahia, around 400 Integralists paraded through the streets of Salvador. On the other hand, on July 9, in Niterói, the 1st National Conference of the PCB ended, institutionalizing a new ruling group and marking a radicalization in the party's policies. The PCB also organized, on August 23, the first large-scale political event sponsored by the Anti-War Committee, the 1st National Congress Against Imperialist War, Reaction and Fascism. The event took place at Teatro João Caetano, after a concentration and a rally in the Cristiano Ottoni square and a march of about 3,000 people along Rua Marechal Floriano Peixoto and Avenida Passos. The event ended in conflict with police forces, leaving fatalities.

In October, the situation precipitated, with the occurrence of open conflicts between anti-fascists and integralists. On the 3rd, a national holiday to commemorate the anniversary of the Revolution of 1930, there was a violent confrontation in Bauru, in the interior of São Paulo. At the time, a “doctrinal lecture” was scheduled to be given by the national leader of the AIB, Plínio Salgado, whose visit had been planned for months by local newspapers. The Union of Employees and Workers of the Noroeste do Brasil Railroad scheduled an extraordinary general assembly at 7:00 pm, one hour before the integralist lecture. At the same time, an integralist parade began which, leaving the local headquarters of the association, accompanied by drums and taroes, sought Plínio Salgado at the hotel where he was staying to take him to the lecture hall. Along the way, the parade began to be admonished by people who shouted anti-fascist slogans. Tempers rose until, in a certain street, a firefight broke out that resulted in the death of one person – Nicola Rosica – and the wounding of four others, all of them Integralists. One of the main accused of having participated in the aggression against the Integralists was a candidate for state deputy for the Coalition of the Left. This coalition had been created in São Paulo by the Coalition of Proletarian Unions, Internationalist Communist League (LCI) and the PSB at the end of August.

Unwinding of the conflict

Call and preparations
On October 7, 1934, the Integralists intended to hold a rally at Praça da Sé, in downtown São Paulo, to commemorate the two years of the Integralist Manifesto. As soon as they learned of this intention, the anti-fascist forces in São Paulo organized themselves to prevent the rally from being held. There are some differences between the sources that report what happened; Fulvio Abramo relates the counter-demonstration directly to the FUA's performance; Eduardo Maffei tries to dilute the role of the FUA and attributes the convening of this counter-demonstration to the work of the PCB; Mário Pedrosa, in turn, stated that “no organization or party can claim the merit of having achieved that formidable mobilization of workers alone.”

All left-wing organizations in São Paulo were summoned to participate in the counter-demonstration, and each entity issued its communiqué to its members, published manifestos to the people and arranged to hold preparatory meetings. The first assembly to examine the situation took place at the Employees Trade Union, with the presence of 40 militants. All approved the proposal to carry out the counter-demonstration; they agreed that it should take place in the same place and time as the announced integralist demonstration, with the purpose of dissolving the AIB rally; and, as far as possible, each organization would try to provide weapons for the counter-demonstrators to carry out their objectives. The Livraria Elo, on Rua Senador Feijó, the headquarters of the Legião Cívica 5 de Julho, on Rua Anita Garibaldi, the headquarters of the Union of Graphic Workers (UTG), on Venceslau Brás and the unions in the Santa Helena Building were used as logistical support points, where weapons were received by antifascist militants. By the 5th, all the weapons received had already been removed from these places. Two commissions were established; a civil one, to organize popular mobilization; and another military, which would outline a strategy for the conflict, of which João Cabanas, Roberto Sisson and Euclydes Bopp Krebs played an active role. Cabanas drew up a strategic plan which divided the forces into three main positions. The first ran from the façade of the Santa Helena building to Rua Wenceslau Braz; the second would be located at the back of the square, in the section corresponding to the sidewalk and sidewalks between the exit of Rua Direita and Rua Wenceslau Braz, and the third, in front of the Equitativa building, between Senador Feijó and Barão de Paranapiacaba streets. Politically, the first position would be occupied by the members of the PSB, the second by the communists and the third by the Trotskyists and anarchists.

Other meetings were held at the FOSP headquarters. According to Maffei, those that attended the preparatory meetings were, among other militants, Joaquim Câmara Ferreira, Hermínio Sacchetta, Arnaldo Pedroso d'Horta, Noé Gertel, Miguel Costa Jr., Igyno Ortega, Fernando Cordeiro, Leonor Petrarca, Eduardo Maffei and Eneida de Moraes, from the PCB; Marcelino Serrano, Carmelo Crispino, João Cabanas, from the PSB; the anarchists Edgard Leuenroth, Pedro Catalo, Rodolfo Felipe, Oreste Ristori and Gusman Soler; Mário Pedrosa and Fúlvio Abramo, from LCI; in addition to trade unionists linked to the Coalition of Proletarian Unions, which included the Union of Employees of Commerce and the Union of Tailors. During the meetings, discussions between Communists and Trotskyists were common. All militants were advised to take care of their own security in the days closest to the conflict, to avoid possible arrests or provocations that could prevent their participation.

Confrontation
In the morning, the anti-fascists began their movements for the counter-demonstration in Praça da Sé, while the Integralists gathered nearby, occupying a large stretch of Avenida Brigadeiro Luiz Antônio, which ran from Avenida Paulista to their headquarters, located near the intersection of Brigadeiro with the Riachuelo, near the São Francisco square. At the North Station, hundreds of uniformed integralists disembarked from the interior of the state. The abundant news in the newspapers about the concentration of the AIB to commemorate the second anniversary of its creation and the profusion of manifestos and pamphlets from the most varied anti-fascist associations distributed throughout the city had aroused the interest of the population, who, at noon, had already flocked to the square in large numbers. By this time, anti-fascist militants have already begun to enter the square, locating themselves in areas previously intended for each group.

Shortly before 2 pm, the police searched the buildings in Praça da Sé. Delegates Eduardo Louzada da Rocha and Saldanha da Gama entered the Santa Helena, inspecting all the building rooms and the headquarters of the various unions that surrounded the square. As they searched the sites, they found no weaponry. Even so, they had the union doors sealed and placed a guard of several soldiers at the gate of the Santa Helena building, prohibiting anyone from entering. Then, they crossed the square and repeated the operation in the Equitativa building. Finding PSB member Ruy Fogaça nearby, Chief Saldanha arrested him and sent him to the Police Station. According to Fúlvio Abramo,

A large number of anti-fascist demonstrators were in front of the Santa Helena building. Very close to the Integralists, they started some provocations, with cries of “morra o integralismo” and “fora galinhas verdes”. The Integralists promptly reacted and a round of turmoil began, with canes, kicks, punches and jerks. The police soon intervened and some shots were fired, causing panic among those present. About ten minutes later, the Integralists regrouped and the bulk of their formations entered the square and stood on the steps of the São Paulo Cathedral, singing their official anthem and giving "anauês". It was during the lull that followed this first conflict that most Integralists entered the square, skirting the back of the cathedral, in Largo João Mendes, and appearing on the side of the Santa Helena building. The atmosphere remained tense, with anti-fascist demonstrators shouting slogans against the Integralists as they sang their hymns. The confrontation erupted after a machine-gun fire hit three civil guards, killing one of them and causing general panic. According to the newspaper A Plebe,

Soon the Integralists responded to the fire of the anti-fascists. Fulvio Abramo took advantage of the moment to start the counter-demonstration, climbing on the pedestal of the column of the A Equitativa building and uttering a few words, in which a hail of bullets was directed at him and the anti-fascists. At that time, Mário Pedrosa was wounded and Décio Pinto de Oliveira, a law student and Communist Youth activist, was shot in the back of the head. Benjamin Constant and Barão de Paranapiacaba were where the conflict was most intense. The anarchists fought with violence against the Integralists and the Public Force during the confrontation. Gusman Soller reportedly stated in the preparatory meetings that the best form of organization against the Integralists would be dynamite, and Edgard Leuenroth expressed that “only the impediment of the fascist parade mattered.” Some soldiers from the Public Force joined the anti-fascists, influenced by João Cabanas, who had great prestige among them. Others took advantage of the moment to settle accounts with the newly created Federal Police, whose centralizing powers took away from the state authorities the relative independence they enjoyed, which deeply irritated the paulistas.

Between 4 pm and 5 pm, there were still some hotbeds of conflict between integralists and anti-fascists who had not yet left the square. The Integralists soon withdrew, following Rua Senador Feijó and reaching Largo São Francisco. The group that went to Largo São Francisco demanded the continuation of the rally, but they were stopped by the police. At the end of the conflict, the integralists disbanded and abandoned their green shirts in the downtown streets of the city, to avoid further aggression. A Plebe, sarcastically, described the stampede as follows:

It is estimated that the confrontation ended with around thirty wounded and seven dead; among them, police officers Hernani de Oliveira and José M. Rodrigues Bonfim; the integralists Jaime Guimarães, Caetano Spinelli and Teciano Bessornia; the civil guard Geraldo Cobra and the anti-fascist student Décio Pinto de Oliveira. The wounded were transported to the Santa Casa hospitals.

After the conflict, the Integralists claimed that the antifascists, hiding on the balconies of the Santa Helena buildings, carefully watched the Integralist demonstration and opened fire as soon as there was a large number of concentrated militants, even shooting at women and children. Fúlvio Abramo and Edgard Leuenroth denied this version, stating that the buildings surrounding Praça da Sé had been interdicted by the police. However, João Cabanas had proposed, in the preparatory meetings, the disposition of snipers inside the buildings that surrounded the square, a proposal that was rejected by the other militants. Later, Gofredo Teles Júnior, who participated in the AIB in his youth, minimized the character of the conflict, in an interview given in 1990 to Eugênio Bucci, in the magazine Teoria e Debate:

Consequences
The Battle of Praça da Sé had a positive repercussion among the Brazilian anti-fascist movement, especially in the Federal District and, combined with the identification of the body of the young militant Tobias Warchavski, triggered a political campaign against the repressive policy of the Vargas government that combined with anti-fascist sentiment, driving a more general movement against the "reaction" and pointing to the formation of a broad progressive front, which would be materialized with the formation of the National Liberation Alliance (ANL). However, after the conflict, the police arrested several leftist militants. The FOSP headquarters was raided and sealed off by the authorities. The anarchists subsequently tried to reorganize the FOSP and sought ways to help the militants who were imprisoned as a result of the antifascist struggle, even creating the Social Prisoners Committee, which carried out some festive activities aimed at raising funds to aid imprisoned comrades and their family members.

In Rio de Janeiro, still on October 7, the first issue of the periodical Jornal do Povo was released, edited by Aparício Torelly and linked to the PCB. During the week following the conflict, the newspaper devoted several reports to the episode in São Paulo, seeking to describe the event in a satirical manner and to make fun of the Integralists. One of its headlines for the week following the event was “An Integralist Doesn't Run, It Flies”, followed by a text, below an image of the conflict: “The integralist stampede, as you can see, was in the most perfect disorder. On the left is a green hen hidden behind the pole, and in the center several squatting. The withdrawal of the 10,000… Save yourself who you can! And the integralists, who like well-sounding sounding phrases, would repeat at that time, accompanied by the clatter of teeth: kill my father who is older!".

See also
6 February 1934 crisis
Battle of Cable Street
Bombing of Plaza de Mayo
Geneva fusillade of 9 November 1932

Notes

References

Bibliography

1934 in Brazil
Anarchism in Brazil
Anti-fascism
Communism in Brazil
Integralism
Fascism in Brazil
Riots and civil disorder in Brazil
Socialism in Brazil